L V star may refer to:
 Brown dwarf
 Red dwarf